The 2015 Northeast Conference softball tournament will be held at North Athletic Complex on the campus of Robert Morris University in Moon Township, Pennsylvania from May 7 through May 9, 2015. The tournament will earn the Northeast Conference's automatic bid to the 2015 NCAA Division I softball tournament. The entire tournament will be available on NEC Front Row.

Tournament

All times listed are Eastern Daylight Time.

References

Tournament, 2015
Northeast Tournament